The communist insurgency in Sarawak was an insurgency in Malaysia from 1962 to 1990, and involved the North Kalimantan Communist Party and the Malaysian Government. It was one of the two Communist insurgencies to challenge the former British colony of Malaysia during the Cold War. As with the earlier Malayan Emergency (1948–1960), the Sarawak Communist insurgents were predominantly ethnic Chinese, who opposed British rule over Sarawak and later opposed the merger of the state into the newly created Federation of Malaysia. The insurgency was triggered by the 1962 Brunei Revolt, which had been instigated by the left-wing Brunei People's Party in opposition to the proposed formation of Malaysia.

The Sarawak Communist insurgents were also supported by Indonesia until 1965, when the pro-Western President Suharto assumed power in a coup and ended the confrontation with Malaysia. During that period, the NKCP's two main military formations were created: the Sarawak People's Guerilla Force (SPGF) or Pasukan Gerilya Rakyat Sarawak (PGRS), and the North Kalimantan People's Army (NKPA) or the Pasukan Rakyat Kalimantan Utara (PARAKU). Following the end of the Confrontation, Indonesian military forces would co-operate with the Malaysians in counter-insurgency operations against their former allies.

The North Kalimantan Communist Party was formally established in March 1970 through the merger of several Communist and left-wing groups in Sarawak including the Sarawak Liberation League (SLL), the Sarawak Advanced Youths' Association (SAYA), and the NKPA. In response to the insurgency, the Malaysian federal government created several "controlled areas" along the Kuching-Serian road in Sarawak's First and Third Divisions in 1965. In addition, the Sarawak Chief Minister Abdul Rahman Ya'kub also managed to convince many of the NKCP insurgents to enter into peace negotiations and lay down their arms between 1973 and 1974. Following the successful peace talks between the Malaysian government and the Malayan Communist Party in 1989, the remaining NKCP insurgents signed a peace agreement on 17 October 1990, which formally ended the insurgency.

History

Background

Apart from the communist insurgency in Peninsular Malaysia, there is another one waged in Sarawak, a Malaysian state on the Borneo island. Communist movements in Sarawak can trace its roots back to a loose movement named "Sarawak Anti-Fascist League" during Japanese occupation in Sarawak. After the establishment of People's Republic of China in 1949, Sarawak Overseas Chinese Democratic Youth League was formed. By 1956, a better organised Sarawak Advanced Youths' Association (SAYA) was formed, by absorbing several small communist groups such as Sarawak Liberation League (SLL) into the organisation. North Kalimantan Communist Party (NKCP) was founded in 1971. All the communists movements including NKCP, unions, schools, associations, sports and cultural groups associated with it were collectively known by the government sources as "Clandestine Communist Organisations". These Communist movements were predominantly dominated by ethnic Chinese but also included a small number of Dayak supporters of about 10% despite various efforts by the communists to garner support from them. However, the communist movements received little support from ethnic Malays and other indigenous Sarawak races. By 1964, government sources estimated 800 to 1,000 well-trained communist participants. At its height, the SCO had 24,000 members. During the 1940s, Maoism had spread among Chinese vernacular schools in Sarawak. Following the Second World War, Communist influence also penetrated the labour movement, trade unions, the Chinese-language media, and the predominantly-Chinese Sarawak United People's Party (SUPP), the state's first political party which was founded in June 1959.

Communist objectives in Sarawak were to achieve self-government and independence for the colony, and to establish a Communist society. The Communist Organisation operated through both legitimate and secret organisations to propagate Communist ideology. Their tactic was to establish a "united front" with other left-wing and anti-colonial groups in Sarawak to achieve their goal of independence of the colony from British rule. According to the Australian historian Vernon L. Porritt, the first known Sarawak Communist Organisation operation was an assault on the Batu Kitang bazaar on 5 August 1952. In response, the Sarawak colonial government approved more funding for security measures, strengthen the security forces, and introduced legislation to deal with internal security. Sarawak Communists were also opposed to the formation of the Federation of Malaysia, a sentiment that was shared by the Indonesian Communist Party, A.M. Azahari's Brunei People's Party, and the Sarawak United People's Party.

The Brunei Revolt
According to the historians Cheah Boon Kheng and Vernon L. Porritt, the Sarawak Insurgency formally began after the Brunei Revolt in December 1962. The Brunei Revolt was a failed uprising against the British by the A.M. Azahari's Brunei People's Party and its military wing, the North Kalimantan National Army (Tentera Nasional Kalimantan Utara, TNKU), who were opposed to the Malaysian Federation and wanted to create a North Borneo state consisting of Brunei, Sarawak, and North Borneo.  According to Porritt, the SCO leaders Wen Min Chyuan and Bong Kee Chok were aware about A.M Azahari's planned revolt but were initially reluctant to resort to guerrilla warfare due to their weak presence in Sarawak's Fourth and Fifth Divisions, which were located adjacent to Brunei. In December 1962, the SCO still lacked a military wing and its members had not yet undergone military training. Following the Brunei Revolt, the SCO switched to a policy of armed insurgency from January 1963 since the defeat of the Bruneian rebels deprived it of a source of weapons.  The Sarawak Communist Organisation's guerrillas would fight alongside the TNKU and Indonesian forces during the Indonesia–Malaysia confrontation (1963–1966).

Following the Brunei Revolt, the British authorities in British Borneo, in co-operation with the Malaysian Special Branch, launched a crackdown of suspected Communists in Sarawak which prompted 700–800 Chinese youths to flee to Indonesian Kalimantan. There, these Communists received military-style training at Indonesian camps. At that time, President Sukarno was pro-Communist and anti-Western. As with Sukarno and the Indonesian Communist Party (PKI), the Sarawak Communists opposed the newly formed Federation of Malaysia as a "neo-colonialist conspiracy" and supported the unification of all former British territories in Borneo to create an independent leftist North Kalimantan state. According to the former British soldier and writer Will Fowler, the so-called "Clandestine Communist Organisation" had plans to launch attacks on police stations and to ambush security forces, paralleling similar tactics used by the Malayan National Liberation Army during the Malayan Emergency.

The Indonesian confrontation

Due to the Sukarno government's hostility to Britain and Malaysia, the Sarawak Communist Organisation used Indonesian Kalimantan as a base for building up a guerrilla force. These Communist exiles in Indonesia would form the core of the North Kalimantan Communist Party's two guerrilla formations: the Sarawak People's Guerilla Force (SPGF—Pasukan Gerilya Rakyat Sarawak (PGRS)) and the North Kalimantan People's Army (PARAKU). The Sarawak People's Guerilla Force was formed on 30 March 1964 at Mount Asuansang in West Kalimantan with the assistance of the Indonesian Ministry of Foreign Affairs. The SPGF's leaders included Bong Kee Chok, Yang Chu Chung, and Wen Ming Chyuan. According to Conboy, the PGRS numbered about 800 and was based in West Kalimantan at Batu Hitam, with a contingent of 120 from the Indonesian intelligence agency and a small cadre trained in China. The PGRS ran some raids into Sarawak but spent more time developing their supporters in Sarawak. The Indonesian armed forces did not approve of the leftist nature of the PGRS and generally avoided them.

Meanwhile, the North Kalimantan People's Army  was formed by Bong Kee Chok near Melawi River in West Kalimantan with the assistance of the PKI on 26 October 1965. While the SPGF under its commander Yang operated in western Sarawak, the NKPA operated in eastern Sarawak. The NKPA was initially commanded by Lam Wah Kwai, who was succeeded by Bong Kee Chok. According to Kenneth Conboy, Soebandrio met with a group of Sarawak Communist leaders in Bogor, and Nasution sent three trainers from Resimen Para Komando Angkatan Darat (RPKAD) Battalion 2 to Nangabadan near the Sarawak border, where there were about 300 trainees. Some three months later, two lieutenants were also sent there.

The Indonesians had planned to use the Sarawak Communists as an indigenous front for their operations during the Indonesian-Malaysian Confrontation. To support this ruse, they even named the organisation the North Kalimantan National Army (Tentara Nasional Kalimantan Utara, TNKU), to link the SCO to the original Bruneian rebels. While the first raids included SCO members, they were often led by regular Indonesian officers or Non-commissioned officers from the Marine commandos (Korps Komando Operasi, KKO), the Army para-commandos (Resimen Para Komando Angkatan Darat, RPKAD), and the Air Force paratroopers ( Pasukan Gerak Tjepat, PGT). Following an attempted coup by pro-PKI elements in the Indonesian military in October 1965, General Suharto assumed power and launched a purge of Communist elements. Overnight, the Sarawak Communists lost a safe haven and the Indonesian military would subsequently co-operate with the Malaysians in counter-insurgency operations against their former allies. According to Porritt, the Indonesian anti-Communist purge was also accompanied by a Dayak-led pogrom targeting the ethnic Indonesian Chinese in West Kalimantan, which received tacit support from the Indonesian authorities.

Counter-insurgency efforts
In response to the Sarawak Communist Organisation's activities, the Sarawak and Malaysian Federal resorted to various counter-insurgency operations. On 30 June 1965, the Sarawak government's Operations Sub-Committee of the State Security Executive Council (Ops SSEC) implemented the Goodsir Plan. This plan involved the resettlement of 7,500 people in five "temporary settlements" along the Kuching-Serian road in Sarawak's First and Third Divisions. The Goodsir Plan was named after David Goodsir, the British acting commissioner of police in Sarawak. These settlements were protected by barbed wire and modelled after the successful New Villages used earlier during the Malayan Emergency.  As with the Briggs Plan, the Goodsir Plan's "controlled areas" succeeded in denying the SCO access to food supplies, basic materials, and intelligence from their Chinese supporters. By the end of 1965, 63 suspected Communists activists had been identified by the authorities. By the end of 1965, the Federal Government had built three permanent settlements at Siburan, Beratok, and Tapah to replace the five temporary settlements, which covered 600 acres and were designed to accommodate 8,000 inhabitants.

By 22 July 1966, the Malaysian Prime Minister Tunku Abdul Rahman estimated that there were approximately 700 Communists in Indonesian Kalimantan and about 2,000 sympathisers. The Tunku also offered amnesty and safe-conduct passes to SCO guerrillas under Operation Harapan, but only 41 guerrillas accepted this offer. The end of the Indonesian-Malaysian Confrontation also enabled the establishment of military co-operation between the Indonesian and Malaysian armed forces against SCO guerrillas in Borneo. In October 1966, both governments allowed their military forces to cross the border in "hot pursuit" operations. Between 1967 and 1968, Indonesian and Malaysian military forces took part in joint operations against the Sarawak Communists, which took an increasingly heavy toll on both the Sarawak People's Guerrilla Force and the North Kalimantan Liberation Army. Due to a decline in manpower, resources and increased isolation from their support base, the SCO shifted from guerrilla warfare towards reestablishing the movement's link with the masses, including the Natives, to preserve the 'Armed Struggle'.

In February 1969, the Sarawak United People's Party's leadership reversed the party's anti-Malaysia policy following a meeting between the party's leader Stephen Yong and Prime Minister Tunku Abdul Rahman. Prior to that, the SUPP had been the main left-wing opposition party in Sarawak and enjoyed the support of Sarawak's ethnic Chinese community. Several members of the party were also members of Communist-affiliated organisations like the Sarawak Advanced Youths' Association (SAYA), the Sarawak Farmers' Organisation, and the Brunei People Party's guerrilla wing, the North Kalimantan National Army. The SUPP's Communist elements were decimated as a result of a statewide crackdown by the authorities between 1968 and 1969. Following state elections in July 1970, the SUPP then entered into a coalition with the Alliance Party's Sarawak partners, the  Bumiputera Party and the Parti Pesaka Anak Sarawak, in the Sarawak State Legislative Assembly. This enabled the Malaysian Federal government to consolidate its control over Sarawak. In exchange, Stephen Yong was appointed to the State Operation's Committee, the state's security committee, which enabled the party to influence counter-insurgency operations and to look after the welfare of SUPP detainees and Chinese settlers in the resettlement centres

On 25 March 1969, Indonesian forces eliminated the Third Branch of the SPGF at Songkong in West Kalimantan following a two-day battle, wiping out the Sarawak People's Guerrilla Force's largest corps. To replace the decimated SPGF, the Sarawak Communist Organisation created the North Kalimantan People's Guerrilla Force at Nonok on 13 July 1969.

The North Kalimantan Communist Party
On 30 March 1970, Wen Ming Chyuan, the Head of the Sarawak People's Guerrillas in Sarawak's First Division, formed the North Kalimantan Communist Party. However, 19 September 1971 was chosen as the official date of the formation of the party to coincide with the Pontianak Conference, which had been held on 17–19 September 1965. While the Pontianak Conference was regarded as the foundation of the Sarawak Communist Movement, none of the conference attendees were Communist. Instead, they consisted of members of the left-wing Liberation League and the "O Members" of the Advanced Youths Association. While they had discussed creating a Communist party in Sarawak, they delayed doing so until 1971 due to the tense political situation in Indonesia.

Rajang Area Security Command (RASCOM)
The Rajang Area Security Command or simply known as RASCOM is a Malaysian security area that covers the area of Rajang River in Sarawak. It was established on 26 March 1972 by the Malaysian government and its main headquarters is located at Sibu.

Defections and decline
The Sarawak Chief Minister Abdul Rahman Ya'kub also made several overtures to the NKCP insurgents and managed to convince several of the insurgents to lay down their arms. In 1973–74, the Malaysian government scored a key victory when Rahman Ya'kub successfully convinced one of the NKCP leaders Bong Kee Chok to surrender along with 481 of his supporters. This was a heavy loss for the NKCP since this number comprised approximately 75 per cent of the NKCP's entire force in Sarawak. The Sri Aman treaty was signed between the Sarawak government and the communist representatives on 6 March 1974 in Simanggang. The name of the township was subsequently changed to "Sri Aman" where Aman is the Malay word for "peace". However, one year after the treaty was signed, more than a hundred of those who surrendered retreated back into the jungles to continue their armed struggle against the government until 1990. In 1975, Chao Hui Ko and his wife, together with a hundred guerilla members of Sarawak People's Guerilla Force laid down their arms. They were given vendor licenses to operate their stalls at a hawker centre near SOC Kuching bus station.

After this defection, only 121 guerilla fighters led by Hung Chu Ting and Wong Lian Kui remained. By 1974, the Communist insurgency had become confined to the Rejang Delta. Both sides sustained casualties and many civilians were also killed and wounded in the cross-fire.

Following the successful Hat Yai peace accords between the MCP and the Malaysian government in 1989, the remaining NKCP guerillas decided to end their insurgency after one of their Chinese contacts Weng Min Chyuan convinced them to negotiate with the Sarawak state government. In July 1990, a series of negotiations between the NKCP and the Sarawak government took place at the town of Bintulu. By 17 October 1990, a peace agreement formally ending the insurgency was ratified at Wisma Bapa Malaysia in the state capital Kuching. Shortly afterwards, the last remaining NKCP operatives led by Ang Cho Teng surrendered. These developments ended the communist insurgency in Sarawak.

See also
 Malayan Emergency (1948–1960)
 Communist insurgency in Malaysia (1968–89)
 Indonesia–Malaysia confrontation
 North Kalimantan Communist Party

Further reading

Primary sources
 Central Intelligence Agency, OPI 122 (National Intelligence Council), Job 91R00884R, Box 5, NIE 54–1–76, Folder 17. Secret. Reproduced at

Secondary Sources

References

Bibliography
 
 
 Ghosh, S. K. "Insurgent Movements in Southeast Asia." India Quarterly 34.3 (1978): 290-312.
 

20th-century rebellions
Communism in Malaysia
Communist rebellions
Wars involving the United Kingdom
Military operations involving Malaysia
Wars involving Malaysia
Military history of Indonesia
Wars involving Indonesia
Sukarno
Rebellions in Asia
Anti-communism
Cold War rebellions
Communism-based civil wars
History of Sarawak
Politics of Sarawak
Conflicts in 1962
Conflicts in 1963
Conflicts in 1964
Conflicts in 1965
Conflicts in 1966
Conflicts in 1967
Conflicts in 1968
Conflicts in 1969
Conflicts in 1970
Conflicts in 1971
Conflicts in 1972
Conflicts in 1973
Conflicts in 1974
Conflicts in 1975
Conflicts in 1976
Conflicts in 1977
Conflicts in 1978
Conflicts in 1979
Conflicts in 1980
Conflicts in 1981
Conflicts in 1982
Conflicts in 1983
Conflicts in 1984
Conflicts in 1985
Conflicts in 1986
Conflicts in 1987
Conflicts in 1988
Conflicts in 1989
Conflicts in 1990
Proxy wars